Beher was the pre-Christian Ethiopian (Aksumite) god of the sea. He was apart of a trinity of pre-Christian Ethiopian religion, together with Astar (god of sun and moon) and Mahrem (god of war and head god).

Article body 

Beher is the god of the land and of the sea and is associated with agricultural fertility. He also appears to be identified with Meder, the Earth-Mother. Beher can be derived from the Ethiopian Christian word for God, egziabher, originally 'Lord of the Land' as well as 'Lord of the World'. All of these names appear together in the writings of Ezana in which the throne is dedicated to Astar, Beher, and Meder. For the Askumites, these gods are comparable to the greek's. Astar was associated with Zeus while Mahrem was paralleled with Ares. Beher is associated to Poseidon.

References

African gods
Axumite gods
Sea and river gods
African shamanism